The Dupont Circle Hotel is a luxury boutique hotel built in 1947, overlooking Dupont Circle, in Washington, D.C.

History
The Dupont Plaza Hotel opened in 1947 on the site of the demolished Leiter House. It was sold in 1997 to the Irish-based Doyle Hotel Group and renamed Jurys Washington Hotel.

Writing in The Washington Post, Nancy Trejos applauded the hotel's furnishings and convenient location, but felt that it charged too much for some of its services. Writing in The New York Times, Fred Bernstein also praised the hotel's room design. He noted that there were "small mistakes" made by his room service.

The Dupont Hotel contains nine floors, bar (Doyle), coffeeshop (Doyle & Co), patio and a restaurant (The Pembroke). The Dupont Circle is located at 1500 New Hampshire Ave NW.

References

External links

 

Dupont Circle
Embassy Row
Hotels established in 1947
Hotel buildings completed in 1947
Hotels in Washington, D.C.
1947 establishments in Washington, D.C.